The 2011 San Jose State Spartans football team represented San Jose State University in the 2011 NCAA Division I FBS football season. The Spartans were led by second year head coach Mike MacIntyre and played their home games at Spartan Stadium. They are members of the Western Athletic Conference. The Spartans finished the season with a record of 5–7, 3–4 in WAC play to finish in a three way tie for fourth place.

Personnel

Coaching staff
Mike MacIntyre returned for his second season as San Jose State head coach, coming off a 1-12 season in 2010.

Depth chart
These are the starters and backups listed in the final depth chart of the season.

Final roster

Schedule

Game summaries

at No. 6 Stanford

at UCLA

Nevada

New Mexico State

at Colorado State

at BYU

Hawaii (Homecoming Game)

at Louisiana Tech

Idaho

at Utah State

Navy

at Fresno State

References
General

Specific

San Jose State
San Jose State Spartans football seasons
San Jose State Spartans football